The Women's points race competition at the 2021 UCI Track Cycling World Championships was held on 24 October 2021.

Results
The race was started at 13:56. 100 (25 km) laps were raced with 10 sprints.

References

Women's points race